Sankharavam is a 1987 Telugu-language action film directed by Krishna. It stars Krishna, Bhanupriya, Rajani, Mahesh Babu. The  film was produced by U. Suryanarayana Babu under the Padmavathi Films banner. Songs were composed by Bappi Lahiri while Raj–Koti composed the background score.

Cast
Krishna as Vijay & Vikram (dual role)
Bhanupriya as Jyothi
Rajani as Inspector Sobharani
Mahesh Babu as Raja
Charan Raj as Pruthvipathi
Giri Babu as Uday
Ranganath as S.P. Kulakarni
Thyagaraju as D.I.G.
Vinod as Z
Mikkilineni as Meesala Pedda Venkataramaiah 
P. J. Sarma as Church Father 
Mada as Ponnu Swamy 
Annapurna as Mahalakshmi 
Maheeja as Damarakalakshmi 
Sandhya as Rekha 
Master V.K.Naveen
Baby Priya as Priya

Music

Songs were composed by Bappi Lahiri. Lyrics are written by Veturi. Music released on LEO Audio Company.

References

Indian action films
Films scored by Bappi Lahiri
Films scored by Raj–Koti
1987 action films
1987 films